The Supreme Marshal of the Kingdom of Bohemia (Czech: Nejvyšší maršálek; German: Oberstlandmarschall) was the third most important Czech provincial official. They were the head of the Bohemian Diet. Originally, the office was common in both Bohemia and Moravia, but after 1625, it was limited to Bohemia proper. The office existed from the 13th century until 1913.

Originally, the supreme marshal was a court official, but gradually the office became a professional function. It was in the holders capacity to decide on the honorary affairs of the lord's state. The supreme marshal was the third most important official of the Kingdom of Bohemia, in the Margraviate of Moravia he was the second most important after the governor. From the beginning of the 14th century, the office was inherited in the family of the lords of Lipá, who lost it after the Battle of White Mountain.

List

See also
Supreme Burgrave of the Kingdom of Bohemia
High Chancellor of Bohemia

Notes

References

This article was initially translated from the Czech Wikipedia.

Political history of the Czech Republic